"A Way You'll Never Be" is a 1933 short story by Ernest Hemingway, published by Charles Scribner in the short story collection Winner Take Nothing. It features the character Nick Adams as he recovers from a traumatic head wound.

Synopsis
Nick Adams has been wounded in Italy during World War I and is suffering from shell-shock, or post-traumatic stress syndrome. He is plagued by nightmares, in which he sees the eyes of an Austrian soldier shooting at him, a yellow house, and a river. Nick's friend, the Italian Captain Paravicini, believes that Nick's head wound should have been trepanned; he worries about Nick's bouts of "craziness." One hot summer day, Nick bicycles from the village of Fornaci to Captain Paravicini's encampment. He sees many bloated corpses and scattered pieces of paper. When Nick reaches camp, an Italian second lieutenant questions Nick's identification papers before Paravicini intervenes and coaxes Nick to lie down and rest before he returns to Fornaci. He shows concern about Nick's mental state. After lying down and dreaming, Nick leaves Paravicini's encampment and goes to find his bike. 

1933 short stories
Short stories by Ernest Hemingway
Autobiographical short stories